Dongyueguan Town is an urban town in and subdivision of Cili County, Hunan Province, People's Republic of China.

Administrative division
The town is divided into 25 villages and 1 community, the following areas: Dongshi Community, Tian'echi Village, Nanjia Village, Jiangxi Village, Caiqiu Village, Yinquan Village, Paoma Village, Banqiao Village, Sancha Village, Liangshui Village, Dangfeng Village, Fojiashan Village, Yangfengping Village, Dayan Village, Fengzidong Village, Fenshui Village, Beiping Village, Changchong Village, Xinhua Village, Guangdong Village, Sanqiao Village, Xibianyu Village, Guanjiayu Village, Dingta Village, Douya Village, and Douxi Village (东市社区、天鹅池村、南家村、江西村、彩球村、银泉村、跑马村、板桥村、三岔村、凉水村、当风村、佛袈山村、阳风坪村、大岩村、风自洞村、分水村、北坪村、长冲村、新花村、广东村、三桥村、西边峪村、管家峪村、丁塔村、斗垭村、陡溪村).

References

Divisions of Cili County